Lucious "Lucky" Jones (born April 22, 1993) is an American professional basketball player for BC Ternopil of the Ukrainian Basketball SuperLeague. He played college basketball for Robert Morris, from 2011 until 2015. Jones entered the 2015 NBA draft, but did not get selected.

High school career
Jones played high school basketball at St. Anthony, in Jersey City, New Jersey, where he was part of the team that won the Non-Public B state championship in 2011.

College career
Jones played college basketball at Robert Morris, from 2011 to 2015. During his senior year, he averaged 14.3 points 5.9 rebounds, and 1.4 assists per game.

Professional career
Following the close of his college career, Jones failed to be drafted in the 2015 NBA draft. On July 7, 2015, Jones joined Liège Basket of the Belgian League. He went on to average 14.3 points 5.2 rebounds, and 1.5 assists per game in 31 Belgian League games.

The following season, he signed with Hyères-Toulon of the French LNB Pro A. On January 4, 2017, Jones left Hyeres-Toulon, and joined the Greek club Promitheas Patras, for the rest of the season, as he replaced Lasan Kromah on the team's squad.

On July 15, 2017, Jones joined PAOK Thessaloniki of the Greek League. He averaged 9.3 points and 5.7 rebounds per game. 

On July 19, 2018, Jones joined local rivals Aris. On July 1, 2019, he parted ways with the Greek club.

In summer 2019, Jones initially signed with his third Greek team, Panionios, but on September 10, 2019, his contract was bought out by German club Medi Bayreuth, which also competes in the FIBA Europe Cup.

On January 14, 2020, he signed with Ionikos Nikaias of the Greek Basket League. In 2020, he signed with Cherkaski Mavpy of the USL, where in four games Jones averaged 16.8 points, 4.5 rebounds, 1.5 assists and 1.3 steals per game. He parted ways with the team on November 4.

On January 12, 2022, Jones signed with BC Ternopil.

References

External links
Eurobasket.com Profile
Greek Basket League Profile 
Greek Basket League Profile 
Robert Morris College Bio

1993 births
Living people
American expatriate basketball people in Belgium
American expatriate basketball people in Finland
American expatriate basketball people in France
American expatriate basketball people in Germany
American expatriate basketball people in Greece
American expatriate basketball people in Ukraine
American men's basketball players
Aris B.C. players
Basketball players from Newark, New Jersey
HTV Basket players
Ionikos Nikaias B.C. players
Liège Basket players
Medi Bayreuth players
P.A.O.K. BC players
Promitheas Patras B.C. players
Robert Morris Colonials men's basketball players
Shooting guards
Small forwards
St. Anthony High School (New Jersey) alumni